Sander Marijnissen (born 25 October 1970) is a Dutch dressage rider. He won a team bronze medal at the 2011 European Dressage Championships aboard Moedwil.

References

External links
 

Living people
1970 births
Dutch male equestrians
Dutch dressage riders
21st-century Dutch people